Barnburgh is a civil parish in the metropolitan borough of Doncaster, South Yorkshire, England.  The parish contains 16 listed buildings that are recorded in the National Heritage List for England.  Of these, one is listed at Grade I, the highest of the three grades, one is at Grade II*, the middle grade, and the others are at Grade II, the lowest grade.  The parish contains the villages of Barnburgh and Harlington, and the surrounding area.  Most of the listed buildings are houses, cottages and associated structures, farmhouses and farm buildings.  The other listed buildings are a church, a stone coffin in the churchyard, a village pump, and a public house.


Key

Buildings

References

Citations

Sources

 

Lists of listed buildings in South Yorkshire
Buildings and structures in the Metropolitan Borough of Doncaster